In Greek mythology, Evenus (Ancient Greek: Εύηνος Eúēnos) a river-god of Aetolia as the son either of Oceanus and Tethys.

Family 
In some accounts, Evenus was represented as a mortal prince or king as the son of Ares and princess Demonice, daughter of King Agenor of Pleuron. He was the brother of Molus, Pylus and Thestius. 

Another version of the myth stated that Evenus was born from Ares and the Pleiad Sterope. Lastly, Heracles was also called Evenus' father in later versions of the myth. 

Evenus married his niece Alcippe, daughter of King Oenomaus of Pisa (another son of Ares and Sterope) by whom he became the father of Marpessa.

Mythology 
When Idas, son of Aphareus, came from Messenia to ask for the hand of Marpessa, Evenus refused his request because he wanted her daughter to remain a virgin. Idas went to his father Poseidon and begged for the use of a winged chariot. Poseidon consented him the use of the chariot, and Idas abducted Marpessa away from a band of dancers and fled from Pleuron in Aetolia. Evenus, after chasing the couple for a long time and realizing he could not catch up to them, killed his horses and then drowned himself in a nearby river Lycormas and became immortal. The river was named later after him.

According to some writers, Evenus, like Oenomaus, used to set his daughter's suitors to run a chariot race with him, promising to bestow her on the winner; but he cut off the heads of his vanquished competitors and nailed them to the walls of his house.

Notes

References 

 Apollodorus, The Library with an English Translation by Sir James George Frazer, F.B.A., F.R.S. in 2 Volumes, Cambridge, MA, Harvard University Press; London, William Heinemann Ltd. 1921. ISBN 0-674-99135-4. Online version at the Perseus Digital Library. Greek text available from the same website.
Bacchylides, Odes translated by Diane Arnson Svarlien. 1991. Online version at the Perseus Digital Library.
 Bacchylides, The Poems and Fragments. Cambridge University Press. 1905. Greek text available at the Perseus Digital Library.
 Gaius Julius Hyginus, Fabulae from The Myths of Hyginus translated and edited by Mary Grant. University of Kansas Publications in Humanistic Studies. Online version at the Topos Text Project.
 Hesiod, Theogony from The Homeric Hymns and Homerica with an English Translation by Hugh G. Evelyn-White, Cambridge, MA.,Harvard University Press; London, William Heinemann Ltd. 1914. Online version at the Perseus Digital Library. Greek text available from the same website.
 Homer, The Iliad with an English Translation by A.T. Murray, Ph.D. in two volumes. Cambridge, MA., Harvard University Press; London, William Heinemann, Ltd. 1924. Online version at the Perseus Digital Library.
 Homer, Homeri Opera in five volumes. Oxford, Oxford University Press. 1920. Greek text available at the Perseus Digital Library.
 Lucius Mestrius Plutarchus, Moralia with an English Translation by Frank Cole Babbitt. Cambridge, MA. Harvard University Press. London. William Heinemann Ltd. 1936. Online version at the Perseus Digital Library. Greek text available from the same website.
 Lucius Mestrius Plutarchus, Morals translated from the Greek by several hands. Corrected and revised by. William W. Goodwin, Ph.D. Boston. Little, Brown, and Company. Cambridge. Press Of John Wilson and son. 1874. 5. Online version at the Perseus Digital Library.
 Pausanias, Description of Greece with an English Translation by W.H.S. Jones, Litt.D., and H.A. Ormerod, M.A., in 4 Volumes. Cambridge, MA, Harvard University Press; London, William Heinemann Ltd. 1918. . Online version at the Perseus Digital Library
Pausanias, Graeciae Descriptio. 3 vols. Leipzig, Teubner. 1903.  Greek text available at the Perseus Digital Library.
 Sextus Propertius, Elegies from Charm. Vincent Katz. trans. Los Angeles. Sun & Moon Press. 1995. Online version at the Perseus Digital Library. Latin text available at the same website.

Potamoi
Kings in Greek mythology
Aetolian characters in Greek mythology
Suicides in Greek mythology